Blake D. Morant is an American legal educator and professor of law at  George Washington University Law School, where he was the Dean in 2014-2019.

History 
Morant received a bachelors (BA) degree in 1975 and juris doctor (JD) degree in 1978 from the University of Virginia.  During his undergraduate years, Morant was inducted into Alpha Phi Alpha.  Morant is married to fellow University of Virginia alumnus Paulette "P.J." Morant.  Prior to his position as Wake Forest Dean, Morant taught law at several institutions across the United States and was most recently a Professor and Assistant Dean at Washington and Lee University School of Law, was a fellow of University College, Oxford, and worked in the private and public sectors.  The Morants officially joined the Wake Forest University community in July 2007. On February 4, 2019 Morant announced his intent to step down at the end of the academic year. He is the former Dean of Wake Forest University School of Law .

References

Wake Forest University faculty
Living people
Washington and Lee University School of Law faculty
George Washington University faculty
George Washington University deans
Deans of law schools in the United States
Year of birth missing (living people)